The Sechura Province is the largest of eight provinces of the Piura Region in Peru.

Location
The province is located on the shores of the Pacific Ocean in the extreme north of Peru, just below the upper most Tumbes Region which is on the border with Ecuador.

Boundaries 
North Paita Province
East Lambayeque Region
South Pacific Ocean.
West Pacific Ocean.

Political division 

Sechura
Bellavista de la Unión
Bernal
Cristo nos Valga
Rinconada Llicuar
Vice

Population 
The province has an approximate population of 47,000 inhabitants.

Capital 
The Capital of this province is the city of Sechura.

See also 
Piura Region
Peru

External links
  Official website of the Sechura Province

1993 establishments in Peru
Provinces of the Piura Region